"Metal on Metal" is an instrumental by Kraftwerk from their 1977 album Trans-Europe Express. This track, combined with  "Abzug", the track immediately succeeding it (and considered part of "Metal on Metal" on English pressings), forms an extended coda to "Trans-Europe Express".

Sampling controversy 
Producer Moses Pelham sampled two seconds of the song and re-used it in the 1997 song  "Nur mir" performed by German rapper Sabrina Setlur. Pelham lost in court to Ralf Hütter and Florian Schneider of Kraftwerk for copyright infringement, but was acquitted after an appeal.

In a 2016, The Guardian reported that the court found in favor of Setlur. However, in July 2019, the European Court of Justice (ECJ) overturned the appeal, ruling in favour of Kraftwerk.

References 

Kraftwerk songs
Sampling controversies
1977 songs